The River Ceiriog is an  long river in north east Wales, whose name may derive from a term meaning "favoured one". It is a tributary of the River Dee. It flows below Chirk Castle and the town of Chirk, where the Chirk Aqueduct carries the Llangollen Canal, and the Chirk Viaduct carries the Shrewsbury–Chester line over the river. The Ceiriog joins the Dee east of the town. In its lower reaches, the river forms the border between Wales and Shropshire in England. Home to a trout fishing club, the river and its valley were described by British prime minister David Lloyd George as "a little bit of heaven on earth". As well as being a home to trout, the first grayling to be artificially reared in Wales were released into the river in 2009.

Due to its steep gradient and juvenile nature the river can be wild at times and has been named as the fastest flowing in Wales. On 16 July 2013, a 21-year-old man was found drowned on a stretch of the river near where it meets the Dee. 

The Environment Agency monitors the river levels at the estate of Brynkinalt. As it nears its end the river can get significantly deeper.

References

Rivers of Shropshire
Rivers of Wrexham County Borough
1Ceiriog